The Baseball Bug is a 1911 silent film comedy short produced by the Thanhouser Company. It starred John W. Noble and Florence La Badie. It also featured real-life baseball players Chief Bender Jack Coombs, Cy Morgan, and Rube Oldring.

Cast
John W. Noble - The Would-Be Baseball Star
Florence La Badie - The Would-Be Baseball Star's Wife
Charles Albert Bender - as himself, Philadelphia Athletics player (as Big Chief Bender)
Jack Coombs - as himself, Philadelphia Athletics player
Cy Morgan - as himself, Philadelphia Athletics player
Rube Oldring - as himself, Philadelphia Athletics player

References

External links

1911 films
American silent short films
1911 short films
Thanhouser Company films
American sports comedy films
1910s sports comedy films
1911 comedy films
American black-and-white films
1910s American films
Silent American comedy films
Silent sports comedy films